Richard Martinez may refer to:
Richard Martinez (politician) (born 1953), New Mexico state senator
Richard Martinez (footballer) (born 1988), American-born Puerto Rican footballer
Oz Fox (Richard Alfonso Martinez), lead guitarist of Stryper
Richard Martinez (musician), L.A drummer and GM of Music is Hope Foundation
President Richard Martinez, a character in Cory in the House
Richard Martinez (music producer), see Sphere